Malik Rasheed Ahmed Khan (born 6 November 1949) is a Pakistani politician who has been a member of the National Assembly of Pakistan, since August 2018. Previously he was a member of the National Assembly from February 2012 to May 2018.

Early life
He was born on 6 November 1949 in Kasur into a Rajpoot family.

Political career

He was elected to the National Assembly of Pakistan as an independent candidate from Constituency NA-140 (Kasur-III) in by-polls held in February 2012. He received 42,295 votes and defeated an independent candidate, Azim Uddin Lakhvi.

He was re-elected to the National Assembly as a candidate of Pakistan Muslim League (N) (PML-N) from Constituency NA-140 (Kasur-III) in 2013 Pakistani general election. He received 69,212 votes and Azeem u Deen Zahid, a candidate of Pakistan Muslim League (Q) (PML-Q).

He was re-elected to the National Assembly as a candidate of PML-N from Constituency NA-138 (Kasur-II) in 2018 Pakistani general election.

References

Living people
Pakistan Muslim League (N) politicians
Punjabi people
Pakistani MNAs 2013–2018
1949 births
Pakistani MNAs 2008–2013
Pakistani MNAs 2018–2023